= Villa Botalla =

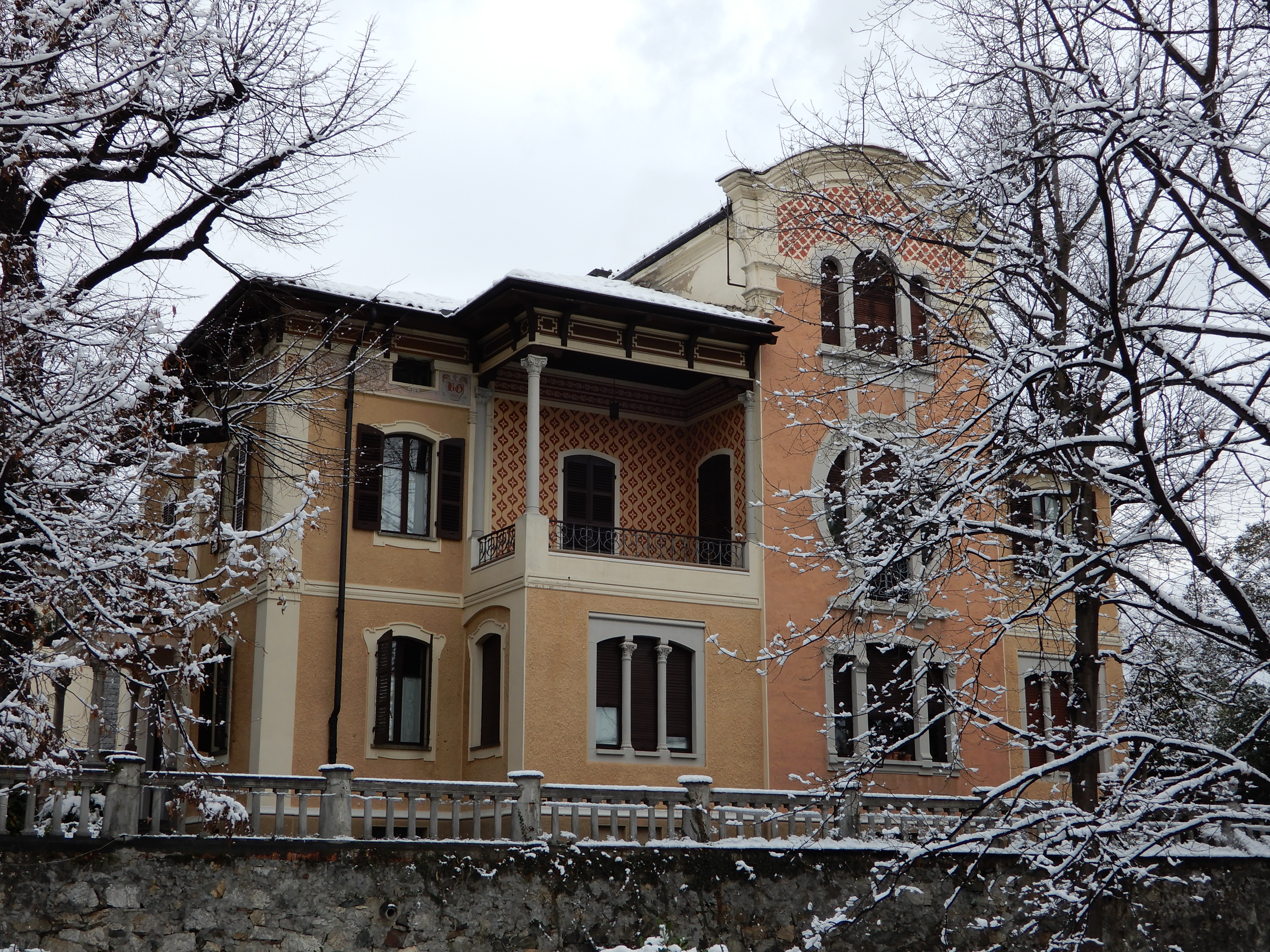
- Villa Botalla in Ivrea
- Click on the map for a fullscreen view

General information
- Location: Ivrea, Italy
- Coordinates: 45°28′10″N 7°52′13.4″E

Villa Botalla is a historic Art Nouveau villa located in Ivrea, Italy.

== History ==
The current appearance of the villa is the result of a remodeling of a previous seventeenth-century building. These works were carried out between 1910 and 1912 and were commissioned by Giuseppe Botalla, a construction contractor who had previously worked abroad, in China, Persia, and North Africa.

== Description ==
The villa features an Art Nouveau style. The main façade is characterized by variously shaped tripartite openings, one of which features a circular shape, referencing French and Belgian Art Nouveau experimentation.

== Gallery ==
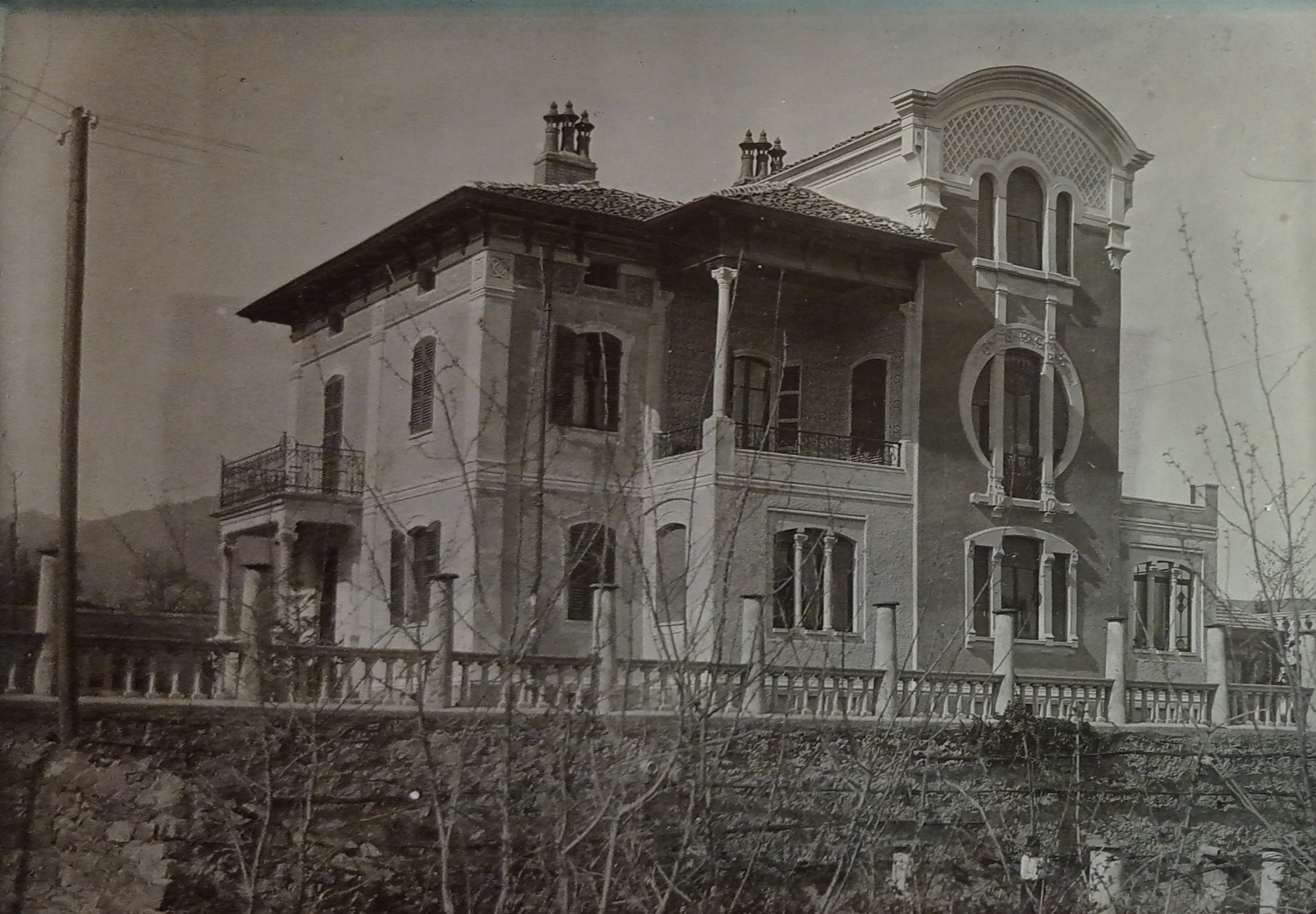

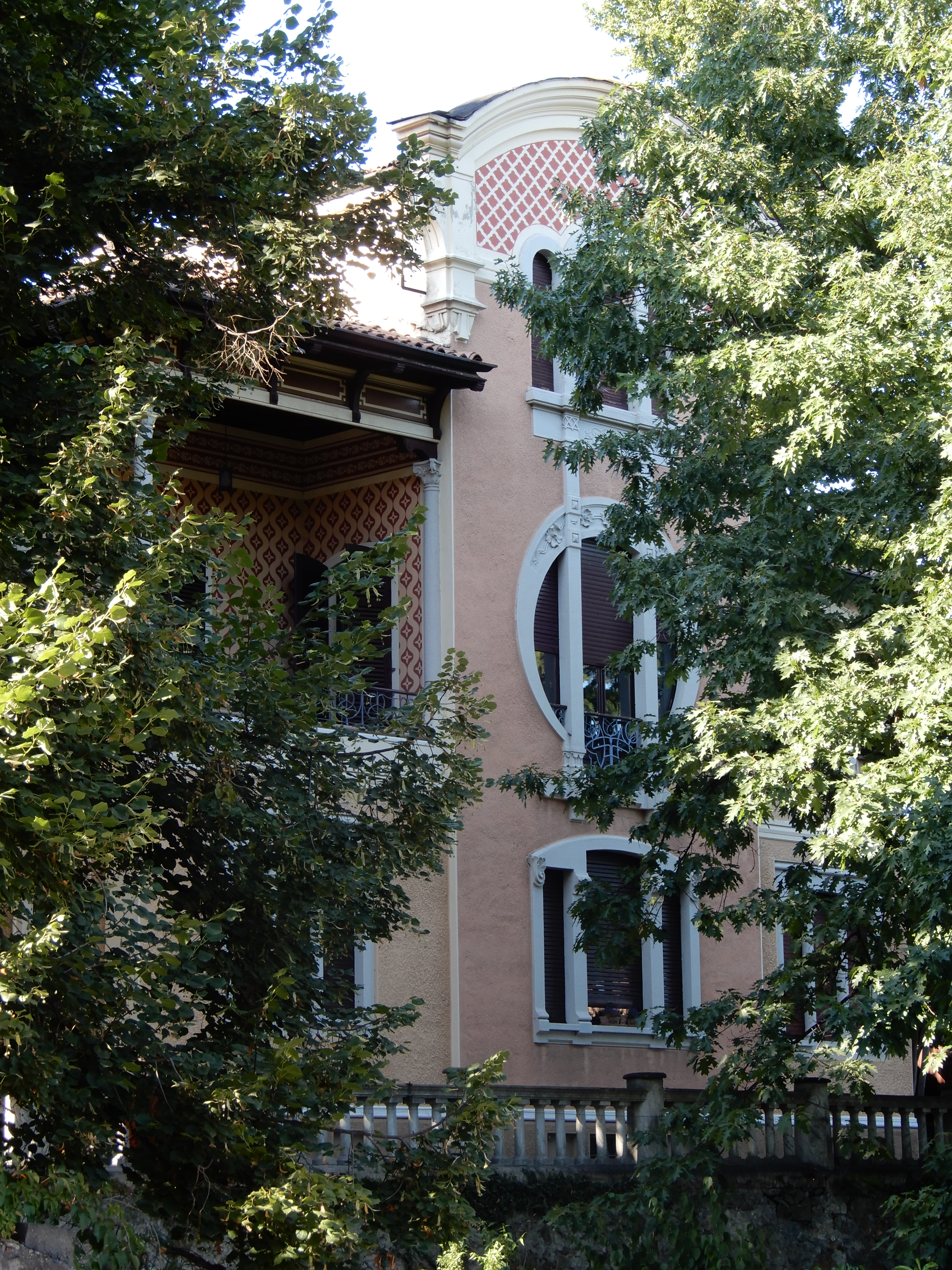

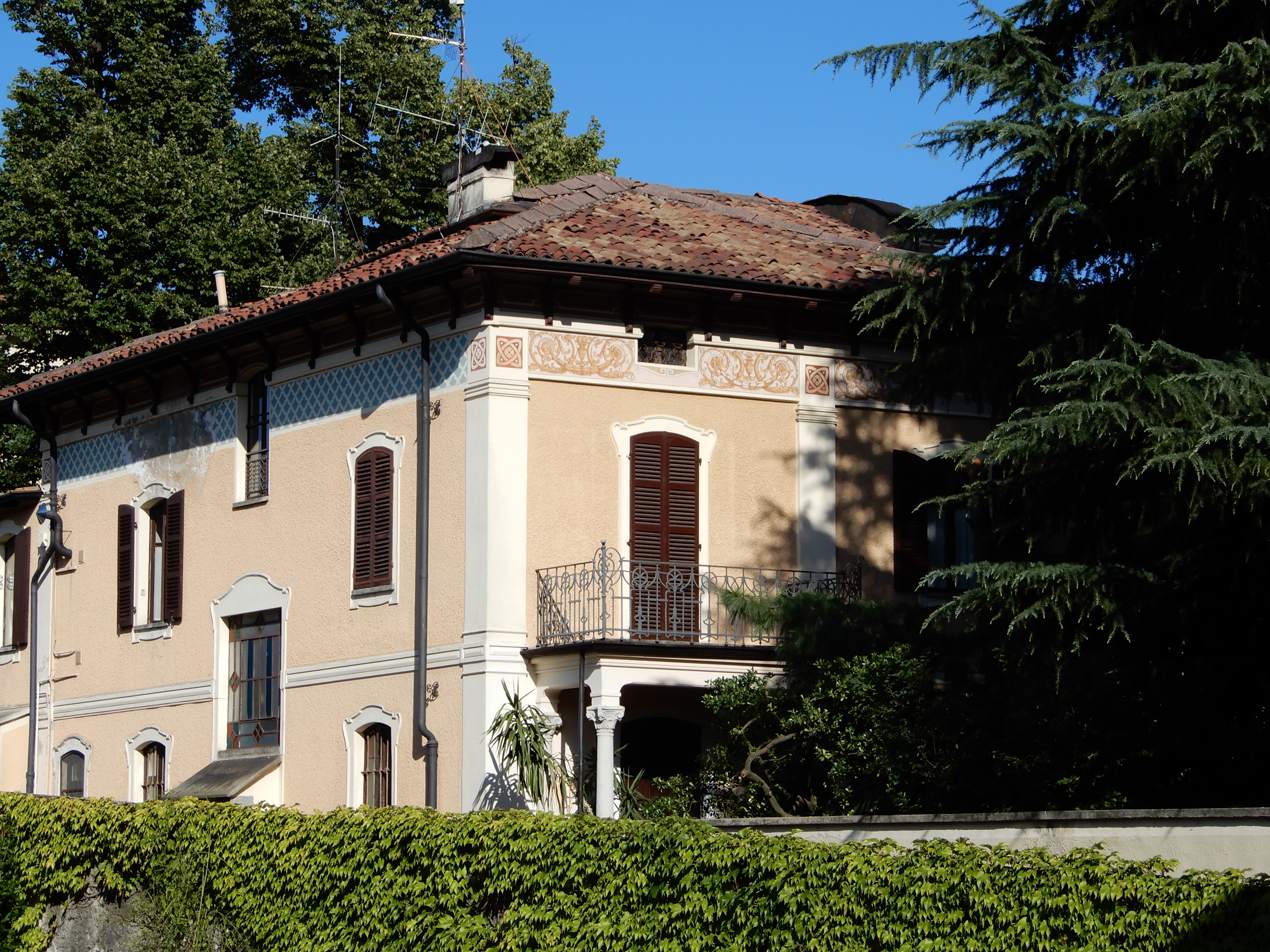
